Pobre gallo (English title: Imperfectly Fortunate) is a 2016 Chilean telenovela created by Daniella Castagno, that premiered on Mega on January 6, 2016 and ended on August 22, 2016. It stars Álvaro Rudolphy, Paola Volpato and Íngrid Cruz.

Plot 
Pobre gallo tells the story about the life of a workaholic man named Nicolas Pérez de Castro (Álvaro Rudolphy), who on the most important day of his life, falls sick on the airport floor. His diagnostic is that he needs to travel to Yerbas Buenas, with his 2 kids: Borja and Camila Pérez de Castro (Augusto Schuster and Montserrat Ballarín). In the town he meets Patricia Flores (Paola Volpato), the Major and Sub Officer of the town Yerbas Buenas of Chilean police officers. But, Carola (Íngrid Cruz) a blast from the past will stop at nothing to regain the heart of her beloved Nicolas.

Cast 
Álvaro Rudolphy as Nicolás Pérez de Castro Aldunate
Paola Volpato as Patricia Flores Flores
Íngrid Cruz as Carola García del Río
Jaime Vadell as Onofré Pérez de Castro
Montserrat Ballarin as Camila Pérez de Castro Achondo
Augusto Schuster as Borja Pérez de Castro Achondo
Teresita Reyes as Gloria
Mauricio Pesutic as Father Armijo
 Andrés Velasco as Eduardo Silva
 Pedro Campos as Juan Silva Flores
 Ignacio Garmendia as Francisco Silva Flores
 Mariana di Girólamo as Andrea Gonzalez Garcia
 Vicente Soto as Tomás Gonzalez García
 Francisco Puelles as Lincoyán Huaiquimil Huaiquimil
 Fernando Godoy as Railef Huaiquimil Huaiquimil
 Fernando Farías as Minchequeo Huaiquimil
 Gabriela Hernández as Rayen Huaiquimi
 Dayana Amigo as Jacqueline "Jackie" Galindo
 Otilio Castro as Esteban Galindo
 Francesca Poloni as Paula "Paulita" Silva Flores
 Steffi Méndez as Martuca Mendez

Guest stars 
 Antonia Zegers as Florencia Achondo-Meyer
 Eduardo Cumar as Roberto Ossandon
 Julio César Serrano as Young windows
 José Antonio Raffo as Officer Andrade
 Romina Norambuena as Officer Morales
 Luz María Yacometti as Carola's Assistant
 Catalina Vera as Noemi

Ratings

References

External links
 

2016 telenovelas
2016 Chilean television series debuts
2016 Chilean television series endings
Chilean telenovelas
Spanish-language telenovelas
Mega (Chilean TV channel) telenovelas